Catherine Friend is an American writer of adult nonfiction, fiction, and children's books. Her works have won her four Goldie Awards from the Golden Crown Literary Society, the Minnesota Book Award for General Nonfiction, and Keystone to Reading Book Award for Primary. She was also a finalist for three Lambda Literary Awards and a Judy Grahn Award.

Personal life 
For 25 years, Friend and her wife, Melissa, lived on Rising Moon Farm, a small farm in southeastern Minnesota, where they raised sheep and used their wool for yarn. The farm was 53 acres and housed sheep, llamas, goats, steers, ducks, chickens, and peacocks.

Education 
Friend received Bachelor of Arts in economics and Spanish, as well as a Master of Science in economics.

Awards

Publications

Books for adults

Fiction 

 A Pirate's Heart (2008)
 The Copper Egg (2016)
 Spark (2017)

Kate Vincent Adventures 

 The Spanish Pearl (2007)
 The Crown of Valencia (2007)
 Compassionate Carnivore: Or, How to Keep Animals Happy, Save Old Macdonald's Farm, Reduce Your Hoofprint, and Still Eat Meat (2008)

Nonfiction 

 Hit by a Farm: How I Learned to Stop Worrying and Love the Barn (2006)
 Sheepish: Two Women, Fifty Sheep, and Enough Wool to Save the Planet (2011)

Books for young people 

 My Head Is Full of Colors (1994)
 The Sawfin Stickleback: A Very Fishy Story, illustrated by Dan Yaccarino (1994)
 Funny Ruby (2000)
 Silly Ruby (2000)
 Well Done Worm! with Kathy Caple (2000)
 The Perfect Nest, illustrated by John Manders  (2007)
 Barn Boot Blues (2011)
 The Broken Elevator, illustrated by Craig Orback (2013)

Eddie the Raccoon series 

 Eddie the Raccoon (2004)
 Eddie and Little Skunk (2004)
 Eddie Digs a Hole (2004)
 Eddie In A Jam (2004)
 No Eggs for Eddie (2004)

References 

Living people
Writers from Minnesota
American lesbian writers
American LGBT writers
Year of birth missing (living people)